Gelanor fortuna is a species of neotropical spider from Panama in the family Mimetidae.

References

Mimetidae
Spiders of Central America
Spiders described in 2016